Commedia may refer to:
 Divine Comedy, a 1321 epic poem by Dante Alighieri, sometimes called the Commedia
 Commedia dell'arte, a professional form of theatre that began in Italy in the mid-16th century
 La Commedia, an early theatre in Naples
 Deceit (1999 film), a 1999 Italian mystery film whose working title was Commedia

See also
 Comedia (disambiguation)